Chama is a village in Rio Arriba County, New Mexico, United States. The population was 1,022 at the 2010 census.

Geography

History
Chama is the western terminus of the Cumbres and Toltec Scenic Railroad, a steam-driven, narrow gauge heritage railway which carries visitors to and from Osier, Colorado, and Antonito, Colorado, during the summer months. It is the remaining 64 mile portion of the Denver & Rio Grande Railroad's San Juan Extension built in the 1880s between Alamosa, Colorado, and Durango, Colorado. The route was abandoned in the late 1960s and the tracks from Chama westward to Durango were torn up soon afterwards.

Demographics

At the 2000 census, there were 1,199 people, 467 households and 312 families residing in the village. The population density was 467.9 per square mile (180.8/km). There were 601 housing units at an average density of 234.5 per square mile (90.6/km). The racial makeup of the village was 67.56% White, 1.58% African American, 2.67% Native American, 0.08% Asian, 25.10% from other races, and 3.00% from two or more races. Hispanic or Latino of any race were 71.23% of the population.

There were 467 households, of which 30.8% had children under the age of 18 living with them, 49.5% were married couples living together, 12.0% had a female householder with no husband present, and 33.0% were non-families. 26.3% of all households were made up of individuals, and 8.8% had someone living alone who was 65 years of age or older. The average household size was 2.57 and the average family size was 3.13.

26.6% of the population were under the age of 18, 6.7% from 18 to 24, 26.3% from 25 to 44, 28.2% from 45 to 64, and 12.3% who were 65 years of age or older. The median age was 38 years. For every 100 females, there were 95.9 males. For every 100 females age 18 and over, there were 90.1 males.

The median household income was $30,513, and the median family income was $31,983. Males had a median income of $27,167 compared with $20,054 for females. The per capita income for the village was $16,670. About 11.9% of families and 17.9% of the population were below the poverty line, including 28.6% of those under age 18 and 13.7% of those age 65 or over.

Education
It is within the Chama Valley Independent Schools school district. Chama has a K-8 school, Chama Middle/Elementary School, while Chama's 9-12 students would by default attend the district's only high school, a part of Escalante Middle/High School.

Pop culture 
Chama has been featured in numerous films, including The Good Guys and the Bad Guys (1969) The Cowboys (1972), Bite the Bullett (1975), The Ballad of Gregorio Cortez (1982), Butch and Sundance: The Early Days (1989), Indiana Jones and the Last Crusade (1989), Wyatt Earp (1994), Wild Wild West (1999), All the Pretty Horses, (2000), Appaloosa (2008), A Million Ways to Die in the West (2014), Godless (2016), and Hostiles (2017).

An episode of Anthony Bourdain: No Reservations was filmed around the Rio Chama. A 2014 episode of the Discovery Channel miniseries Klondike was also filmed around Chama.

Climate
This climatic region is typified by large seasonal temperature differences, with short, cool-to-warm summers and long, cold (sometimes severely cold) winters. According to the Köppen Climate Classification system, Chama has a subarctic continental climate, abbreviated "Dfb" on climate maps.

See also
Chama, Colorado
Rio Chama
Cumbres Pass
San Juan Mountains
San Juan Express

References

External links

 Village website
 Chama Valley Chamber of Commerce

Villages in Rio Arriba County, New Mexico
Villages in New Mexico
Railway stations in New Mexico